Epsilon Indi, Latinized from ε Indi, is a star system located at a distance of approximately 12 light-years from Earth in the southern constellation of Indus. The star has an orange hue and is faintly visible to the naked eye with an apparent visual magnitude of 4.83. It consists of a K-type main-sequence star, ε Indi A, and two brown dwarfs, ε Indi Ba and ε Indi Bb, in a wide orbit around it. The brown dwarfs were discovered in 2003. ε Indi Ba is an early T dwarf (T1) and ε Indi Bb a late T dwarf (T6) separated by 0.6 arcseconds, with a projected distance of 1460 AU from their primary star.

ε Indi A has one known planet, ε Indi Ab, with a mass of 3.3 Jupiter masses in a nearly circular orbit with a period of about 45 years. ε Indi Ab is the second-closest Jovian exoplanet, after ε Eridani b. The ε Indi system provides a benchmark case for the study of the formation of gas giants and brown dwarfs.

Observation
The constellation Indus (the Indian) first appeared in Johann Bayer's celestial atlas Uranometria in 1603. The 1801 star atlas Uranographia, by German astronomer Johann Elert Bode, places ε Indi as one of the arrows being held in the left hand of the Indian.

In 1847, Heinrich Louis d'Arrest compared the position of this star in several catalogues dating back to 1750, and discovered that it possessed a measureable proper motion. That is, he found that the star had changed position across the celestial sphere over time. In 1882–3, the parallax of ε Indi was measured by astronomers David Gill and William L. Elkin at the Cape of Good Hope. They derived a parallax estimate of arcseconds. In 1923, Harlow Shapley of the Harvard Observatory derived a parallax of 0.45 arcseconds.

In 1972, the Copernicus satellite was used to examine this star for the emission of ultraviolet laser signals. Again, the result was negative. ε Indi leads a list, compiled by Margaret Turnbull and Jill Tarter of the Carnegie Institution in Washington, of 17,129 nearby stars most likely to have planets that could support complex life.

The star is among five nearby paradigms as K-type stars of a type in a 'sweet spot' between Sun-analog stars and M stars for the likelihood of evolved life, per analysis of Giada Arney from NASA's Goddard Space Flight Center.

Characteristics

ε Indi A is a main-sequence star of spectral type K5V. The star has only about three-fourths the mass of the Sun and 71% of the Sun's radius. Its surface gravity is slightly higher than the Sun's. The metallicity of a star is the proportion of elements with higher atomic numbers than helium, being typically represented by the ratio of iron to hydrogen compared to the same ratio for the Sun; ε Indi A is found to have about 87% of the Sun's proportion of iron in its photosphere.

The corona of ε Indi A is similar to the Sun, with an X-ray luminosity of 2 ergs s−1 (2 W) and an estimated coronal temperature of 2 K. The stellar wind of this star expands outward, producing a bow shock at a distance of 63 AU. Downstream of the bow, the termination shock reaches as far as 140 AU from the star.

This star has the third highest proper motion of any star visible to the unaided eye, after Groombridge 1830 and 61 Cygni, and the ninth highest overall. This motion will move the star into the constellation Tucana around 2640 AD. ε Indi A has a space velocity relative to the Sun of 86 km/s, which is unusually high for what is considered a young star. It is thought to be a member of the ε Indi moving group of at least sixteen population I stars.

As seen from ε Indi, the Sun is a 2.6-magnitude star in Ursa Major, near the bowl of the Big Dipper.

Companions

Brown dwarfs
In January 2003, astronomers announced the discovery of a brown dwarf with a mass of 40 to 60 Jupiter masses in orbit around ε Indi A at a distance of at least 1,500 AU. In August 2003, astronomers discovered that this brown dwarf was actually a binary brown dwarf, with an apparent separation of 2.1 AU and an orbital period of about 15 years. Both brown dwarfs are of spectral class T; the more massive component, ε Indi Ba, is of spectral type T1–T1.5 and the less massive component, ε Indi Bb, of spectral type T6.

Evolutionary models have been used to estimate the physical properties of these brown dwarfs from spectroscopic and photometric measurements. They have an estimated metallicity of [M/H] = –0.2.

Planetary system
 
 

Measurements of the radial velocity of Epsilon Indi by Endl et al. (2002) appeared to show a trend that indicated a planetary companion with an orbital period of more than 20 years. A substellar object with minimum mass of 1.6 Jupiter masses and orbital separation of roughly 6.5 AU (a Jupiter-analogue) was within the parameters of the highly approximate data.

A visual search using the ESO's Very Large Telescope found one potential candidate. However, a subsequent examination by the Hubble Space Telescope NICMOS showed that this was a background object. As of 2009, a search for an unseen companion at 4 μm failed to detect an orbiting object. These observations further constrained the hypothetical object to be 5–20 times the mass of Jupiter, orbiting between 10 and 20 AU and have an inclination of more than 20°. Alternatively, it may be an exotic stellar remnant.

A longer study of radial (to or from Earth) velocity, using the HARPS Echelle spectrometer, to follow up on Endl's findings, was published in a paper by M. Zechmeister et al. in 2013. The findings confirm that, quoting the paper, "ε Ind A has a steady long-term trend still explained by a planetary companion". This refined the radial-velocity trend observed and indicated a planetary companion with an orbital period greater than 30 years. A gas giant with a minimum mass of 0.97 Jupiter masses and a minimal orbital separation of roughly 9.0 AU could explain the observed trend. 9.0 AU is about the same distance out as Saturn. This does not quite qualify the planet as a true Jupiter analogue because it orbits considerably further out than 5.0 AU. Not only does it orbit further out, but ε Indi A is also dimmer than the Sun, so it would only receive about the same amount of energy per square meter as Uranus does from the Sun. The radial-velocity trend was observed through all the observations so far taken using the HARPS spectrometer but due to the long time period predicted for just one orbit of the object around ε Indi A, more than 30 years, the phase coverage was not yet complete.

In March 2018, a preprint was posted to arXiv that confirmed the existence of Epsilon Indi Ab using radial velocity measurements. In December 2019, the confirmation of this planet, along with updated parameters from both radial velocity and astrometry, was published by Fabo Feng et al. in Monthly Notices of the Royal Astronomical Society. They show that the orbit is slightly eccentric, with a semi-major axis of about 11.6 AU and an eccentricity of about 0.26. The mass of the planet is 3.25 Jupiter masses, and its orbital period is about 45 years. At a separation of 3.3 arcseconds from its host star, direct imaging of this planet using the James Webb Space Telescope is planned.

No excess infrared radiation that would indicate a debris disk has been detected around ε Indi. Such a debris disk could be formed from the collisions of planetesimals that survive from the early period of the star's protoplanetary disk.

See also
 List of nearest stars

Notes

References

External links
 Discovery of Nearest Known Brown Dwarf (eso0303 : 13 January 2003)
 
 
 
Epsilon Indi Ab at The Extrasolar Planets Encyclopaedia. Retrieved 2018-07-02.

K-type main-sequence stars
Planetary systems with one confirmed planet
T-type stars
High-proper-motion stars
Local Bubble
Indus (constellation)
Indi, Epsilon
CD-57 08464
0845
209100
108870
8387